Hazel A. McIsaac (1933 – December 14, 2012) was a politician in Newfoundland and Labrador. She represented St. George's from 1975 to 1979 as a Liberal. McIsaac was the first woman elected to the assembly after Newfoundland entered the Canadian Confederation in 1949.

She was born Hazel Gillam in Robinsons. McIsaac was elected for the District of St. George's as a Liberal in the 1975 general election. She was defeated when she ran for reelection in 1979. After leaving provincial politics, she served on the town council for St. George's.

McIsaac died at the age of 79 at the Bay St. George Long Term Care Centre after a ten-year battle with Alzheimer's disease.

The ferry MV Hazel McIsaac was named in her honour in 2011. The mid-sized passenger and car ferry provides service between  Long Island and Little Bay Islands in Green Bay.

References 

1933 births
2012 deaths
Liberal Party of Newfoundland and Labrador MHAs
Women MHAs in Newfoundland and Labrador
Newfoundland and Labrador municipal councillors
Women municipal councillors in Canada